Koh Preab, "Dove Island", named "Île du Départ" during the French colonial period is an island of Cambodia, situated in the Bay of Kompong Saom Sihanoukville Province near its south-eastern coast. This small island has been integrated into the local harbor's breakwater just north of the Sihanoukville Autonomous Port. The estimated terrain elevation above sea level is 3 meters. A unit of the Royal Cambodian Navy is based on the island.

See also 
 Koh Rong
 Koh Rong Sanloem
 List of islands of Cambodia
 List of Cambodian inland islands
 Koh Kong

References

External links
list of Cambodia's islands
 Koh Preab (Kaoh Preab)
 The geographical name data for Kaôh Préap in Cambodia

Islands of Cambodia
Geography of Sihanoukville province
Islands of the Gulf of Thailand